The Second Triumvirate was the governing body of the United Provinces of the Río de la Plata (present-day Argentina and Uruguay) that followed the First Triumvirate in 1812, shortly after the May Revolution, and lasted 2 years.

History
The second triumvirate was formed after the Revolution of October 8, 1812, when the generals José de San Martín and Carlos María de Alvear joined forces with former supporters of Mariano Moreno and deposed the First Triumvirate. When the members of the First Triumvirate were deposed, the Cabildo appointed new ones. Nicolás Rodríguez Peña was appointed by 172 votes against 12, Antonio Álvarez Jonte by 147 against 35, and Juan José Paso by 96 against 87. The new triumvirate called the Assembly of Year XIII, a popular request that the First Triumvirate had refused to follow. The Triumvirate began its functions on October 8, 1812.

The second triumvirate took measures against the members of the first triumvirate. Pueyrredón was exiled to San Luis, and Rivadavia was imprisoned and on trial. Chiclana was put on trial, found innocent, and then appointed as governor of Salta. Sarratea, under protection of the British diplomacy, did not face any reprisals.

The main actions of the Triumvirate were:
 to establish a commission on December 4, 1812 for the creation of the Constitution of Argentina
 to issue a call for the Assembly of Year XIII on January 31, 1813.
 to create the Province of Cuyo (the present-day provinces of Mendoza, San Juan and San Luis) on November 14, 1813.

As the 1813 Assembly decided to replace the Triumvirate with a one-person Supreme Director, it ceased its functions on January 22, 1814, and Gervasio Antonio de Posadas assumed control as the first Supreme Director of the United Provinces of the Río de la Plata. One year later, on January 31, 1815, he was replaced by his nephew Carlos María de Alvear, relying on the support of the powerful Logia Lautaro.

Members

References

Bibliography 

 

Political history of Argentina
Argentine War of Independence
1812 establishments in South America